Philip Rose (July 4, 1921 – May 31, 2011) was a Broadway theatrical producer of such productions as A Raisin in the Sun, The Owl and the Pussycat, Does a Tiger Wear a Necktie?, Purlie, and Shenandoah. His work was particularly notable for its social insight and distinctive social conscience.

Art and social justice
Philip Rose was born Philip Rosenberg on the Lower East Side of Manhattan, to Russian Jewish parents.
 
As a young man, he earned money singing at weddings and funerals and later worked briefly as a bill collector. His family moved to Washington, D.C. during the Great Depression and he began working at 16 for many of the local stores in the area. 
 
While working in mostly black neighborhoods, he ended up going into  people's homes and was accepted by some of the families forming personal friendships. It was there that he learned about Gospel music and Jazz. Washington, D.C., at the time, was a segregated city, but he found ways to spend time with friends he made there. He attributed this experience with segregation as having changed his life. His father, Max Rosenberg, always expressed himself differently on racial matters than the people in the neighborhood. He was very critical of racism and this made a lasting impression on the young Philip Rose. 
 
In 1945, after arriving in New York City, Philip Rose toured with an opera company. He was in a Gilbert & Sullivan company in Greenwich Village where he met his wife, the actress Doris Belack. Shortly afterward, he began touring for a whole season doing musicals.

Civil liberty and human friendship
Philip Rose went to Harlem and began to sing Jazz. He became instantly involved in the Civil Rights Movement. While in Harlem, he got to know struggling black artists including William Marshall, who was one of the few black actors to have a career. William Marshall was among the artists Philip Rose invited to his apartment for a meeting concerning the Mississippi lynching of Emmett Till. Rose regarded his friendships with Sidney Poitier and Lorraine Hansberry as amongst two of the most important in his life. 
 
When he decided to produce A Raisin in the Sun for Broadway, the first person he called was Sidney Poitier, not just because he wanted him to  because he had no idea where to begin in the casting process. Sidney Poitier got an attorney for him, assisted him in the whole process, and remained his best friend up until Philip's death.

Struggle against racism
Philip Rose, in his work and his life, struggled against racism and discrimination in all its multifarious forms and disguises. He has observed that though racism has been extant in numerous contexts, it began in America as a business proposition: Slavery. The social consciousness of the work he has produced reflects his own perceptive, empathic consciousness. 
 
In two anecdotes relating to Raisin in the Sun, he pointed out that in 1959, the year the play was first produced, there was a man seated in the best seat in the house (fourth row center). This man asked at intermission to change his seat. There did not appear to be a problem with the seat and the house was completely sold out. The man was permitted to stand in the back of the theater. Philip Rose went to the man's seat and noticed that there was a black couple on either side of the seat he had occupied. This man preferred to stand at the back of the theater for the entire performance rather than in the best seat in the house situated between two black couples, an interesting commentary on the irrationality of prejudice. 
 
Another anecdotal experience occurred while Raisin in the Sun was touring Washington D.C. Near the end of the play, Walter Lee Younger says:
 
"We have decided to move into our house because my father — my father — he earned it for us brick by brick.".
 
The audience which was 95% white applauded. The next day, along with a rave review there was an editorial stating that the same people who applauded Walter Lee, went home and kept fighting to keep black people out of their neighborhoods. 
 
Philip Rose expressed the hope that the message of the play might cause one or two of these individuals to learn something about their own attitudes and to examine those of the society in general.

Innovation and diversity on Broadway
Philip Rose was honored in 1995  with the Actors' Equity Rosetta Lenoire Award for "being an innovator in the theater" and for showcasing "a vast and rich array of actors and playwrights and for exposing Broadway audiences to a world of diversity."
 
Rose worked over the course of five decades as producer and director of theatrical events imbued with an urgent impulse to change the thinking and assumptions of audiences on a range of social issues. In Ossie Davis' Purlie Victorious and the musical Purlie, the issue was racism; In Shenandoah, the issue was war; in Sun Flower, the issue was women's rights; and in My Old Friends, the issue was old age. 
 
Rose was an innovator in non-traditional casting too. In 1964, he cast the black actress Diana Sands opposite Alan Alda in the two-character comedy/love story The Owl and the Pussycat. When fellow producer Alexander Cohen requested that the script be rewritten for Diana Sands, Philip Rose stated, "She's doing it exactly as it is written — a woman who falls in love."  After the opening, Mr. Cohen said: "I was all wrong."
 
The Owl and the Pussycat became a Broadway hit.
 
On the subject of human brotherhood, the idea at the root of much of his work,  Philip Rose noted that the yiddish song "Chussen Kalle Mazel Tov" and the song "St. James Infirmary", which arises from the American black blues tradition, share the same melody. One inference to be drawn is that both songs arise from the heart of a people and the sameness of melody shows that people who've sometimes seen each other as different are much more alike then they realize. In their depths, the world is felt the same way.

Philip Rose died in Englewood, New Jersey on May 31, 2011. His wife, actress Doris Belack died four months later on October 4, 2011.

Theatrical credits

Productions
The Cemetery Club [Original, Play, Comedy]
Produced by Philip Rose; 
Executive Producer: Philip Rose May 15, 1990 - Jul 1, 1990 
Truly Blessed [Original, Musical]
Produced by Philip Rose; 
Executive Producer: Philip Rose April 22, 1990 - May 20, 1990 
Shenandoah [Revival, Musical]
Directed by Philip Rose; 
Book by Philip Rose August 8, 1989 - September 2, 1989 
Checkmates  [Original, Play, Comedy]
Produced by Philip Rose August 4, 1988 - December 31, 1988 
Late Nite Comic [Original, Musical]
Directed by Philip Rose October 15, 1987 - October 17, 1987 
Amen Corner [Original, Musical]
Directed by Philip Rose; 
Associate Produced by Philip Rose; 
Book by Philip Rose November 10, 1983 - December 4, 1983 
Comin' Uptown [Original, Musical]
Directed by Philip Rose; 
Book by Philip Rose Dec 20, 1979 - Jan 27, 1980 
My Old Friends [Original, Musical]
Directed by Philip Rose Apr 12, 1979 - May 27, 1979 
Angel  [Original, Musical]
Directed by Philip Rose; 
Produced by Philip Rose May 10, 1978 - May 13, 1978 
The Trip Back Down [Original, Play]
Produced by Philip Rose Jan 4, 1977 - Mar 5, 1977 
Kings  [Original, Special, Dance, Drama]
Produced by Philip Rose Sep 27, 1976 - Oct 18, 1976 
Shenandoah  [Original, Musical]
Directed by Philip Rose; 
Produced by Philip Rose; 
Book by Philip Rose Jan 7, 1975 - Aug 7, 1977 
Purlie  [Revival, Musical, Comedy]
Directed by Philip Rose; 
Produced by Philip Rose; 
Book by Philip Rose Dec 27, 1972 - Jan 7, 1973 
Purlie  [Original, Musical, Comedy]
Directed by Philip Rose; 
Produced by Philip Rose; 
Book by Philip Rose March 15, 1970 - November 6, 1971 
Does a Tiger Wear a Necktie?  [Original, Play]
Produced by Philip Rose Feb 25, 1969 - Mar 29, 1969 
The Ninety Day Mistress [Original, Play]
Directed by Philip Rose; 
Produced by Philip Rose Nov 6, 1967 - Nov 25, 1967 
Nathan Weinstein, Mystic, Connecticut  [Original, Play, Comedy]
Produced by Philip Rose Feb 25, 1966 - Feb 26, 1966 
The Owl and the Pussycat [Original, Play, Comedy]
Produced by Philip Rose Nov 18, 1964 - Nov 27, 1965 
Cafe Crown [Original, Musical, Comedy]
Produced by Philip Rose Apr 17, 1964 - Apr 18, 1964 
Nobody Loves an Albatross [Original, Play, Comedy]
Produced by Philip Rose Dec 19, 1963 - Jun 20, 1964 
The Heroine [Original, Play]
Produced by Philip Rose Feb 19, 1963 - Mar 9, 1963 
Bravo Giovanni [Original, Musical]
Produced by Philip Rose May 19, 1962 - Sep 15, 1962 
Purlie Victorious [Original, Play, Comedy]
Produced by Philip Rose Sep 28, 1961 - May 12, 1962 
Semi-Detached [Original, Play]
Produced by Philip Rose Mar 10, 1960 - Mar 12, 1960 
A Raisin in the Sun [Original, Play, Drama]
Produced by Philip Rose Mar 11, 1959 - Jun 25, 1960

Filmography

Producer, miscellaneous crew, actor, writer, self producer
1980s 
A Raisin in the Sun (1961) (producer/stage production)
1960s
Purlie (1981) (TV) (producer)

Miscellaneous crew
1970s 
The Owl and the Pussycat (1970) (presenter: stage production) 
1960s
Gone Are the Days! (1963) (producer: original stage production) ... aka Purlie Victorious ... aka The Man from C.O.T.T.O.N. (USA: reissue title)

Actor
White Hunter . ... McKimba (1 episode, "The Squire of the Serengeti", 1957)
Across the Bridge (1957) (uncredited)

Writer
Purlie (1981) (TV) (play Purlie Victorious)

Self
American Masters . ... Himself - Producer A Raisin in the Sun (1 episode, 2000)
Sidney Poitier: "One Bright Light" (2000) TV Episode . ... Himself - Producer A Raisin in the Sun

References

External links

Philip Rose Papers. Yale Collection of American Literature, Beinecke Rare Book and Manuscript Library.

1921 births
2011 deaths
American theatre managers and producers
Businesspeople from New York City
20th-century American Jews
20th-century American businesspeople
21st-century American Jews
Tony Award winners